Franklin White Turnbull (19 June 1881 – 24 February 1971) was a Conservative member of the House of Commons of Canada. He was born in Carleton County, Ontario and became a barrister.

Turnbull attended schools at Vankleek Hill, Ontario, Edmonton, and Springhill, Ontario (secondary school number 8). He studied law with F.W.A.G. Haultain in Regina, Saskatchewan.

He was first elected to Parliament at the Regina riding in the 1930 general election after a previous unsuccessful campaign there in the 1925 election. Riding changes meant that Turnbull became a candidate at the new Regina City riding for the 1935 election, but was defeated by Donald McNiven of the Liberal party.

References

External links
 

1881 births
1971 deaths
Conservative Party of Canada (1867–1942) MPs
Members of the House of Commons of Canada from Saskatchewan
Politicians from Ottawa